The Poland national rugby union team represents Poland in men's international rugby union competitions. Nicknamed The White and Reds (Biało-czerwoni), is considered one of the stronger tier 3 teams in European rugby and currently compete in the second division of the Rugby Europe International Championships in the Rugby Europe Trophy, a competition which is just below the Rugby Europe Championship where the top 6 countries in Europe (apart from the teams in the 6 nations) compete. They are yet to participate in any Rugby World Cup and often play in white with red shorts as well as in red with white shorts.

History

Poland made their international debut against East Germany in 1958 in Łódź, which they won by just one point, 9–8. Later that year they played  in Krasnoyarsk, who defeated them 11–3. The following year they played two matches at Dinamo Stadion in Bucharest, defeating Czechoslovakia and then losing to Romania. Poland continued to contest internationals with these nations over the coming years.

They defeated East Germany in Grimma the 1971, this was followed by strong form from the Polish, winning matches against the Netherlands, Morocco, Czechoslovakia and the Soviet Union. In 1975 Poland played Italy in Treviso, and lost 13–28. In 1977 Poland played a France XV again, and lost 9–26; also that year they played Italy, and lost by only six points, with the final score being 6–12. They played a France XV again in 1978, losing 24–35. They also defeated Spain that year.

Poland played Italy in 1979, losing 3–13, and then played a France XV the following year, though they did not perform as well as previous meetings, losing 42–0. A subsequent match against a France XV in 1981 saw the France XV defeat Poland 49–6. A match between the two sides in 1984 produced a good result for the Polish, losing 19–3. A match against the Italian Barbarians the following year produced the same scoreline.

In 1987 Poland played two Italian teams, the Italian Barbarians and Italy under-21, although they lost to the Barbarians, they won against the under-21 team. Poland did not play at the 1987 World Cup. In 1990 they played the full Italy team in Naples, losing 34–3. Poland did not play in the 1991 World Cup in England. From 1992 to 1993 Poland won six matches in a row. Russia won five to 41 in a following match.

Poland played Italy A, but lost 19–107. Poland also played Romania in 1998, losing 74–13. Poland were grouped in Pool D of round two of the 2007 Rugby World Cup European qualify tournament. Poland performed very well in the pool, winning all four of their games, and finishing at the top of the pool. This saw them through to Pool A of Round three, but they were knocked out here, finishing fourth in the pool.

Record

World Cup

European Competitions Since 2000

Overall

Recent Matches

Current squad
The following players were selected for the 2021–22 Rugby Europe Trophy match against  Switzerland on 20th November 2021.

Head Coach:  Christian Hitt

Caps updated: 22nd November 2021, after match with  Switzerland. 

|}

Recent call-ups
The following players have also been called up to the squad within the last 12 months.

Current coaching staff
The current coaching staff of the Polish national team:

Former coaches

See also
 Rugby union in Poland
 Polski Związek Rugby
 Poland national rugby sevens team
 Poland women's national rugby sevens team
 Sport in Poland

References

External links
Polski Związek Rugby - Official Site  
Polish Rugby Portal  

Poland national rugby union team
Rugby union in Poland
Teams in European Nations Cup (rugby union)
European national rugby union teams
National sports teams of Poland